Chillán is the capital city of the Ñuble Region in the Diguillín Province of Chile located about  south of the country's capital, Santiago, near the geographical center of the country. It is the capital of the new Ñuble Region since 6 September 2015. Within the city are a railway station, an inter-city bus terminal, an agricultural extension of the University of Concepción, and a regimental military base.  The city includes a modern-style enclosed shopping mall in addition to the multi-block open-air street market where fruits, vegetables, crafts and clothing are sold.  The nearby mountains are a popular destination for skiing and hot spring bathing.

Founded by the Spanish in 1580 the city persisted despite numerous attacks by Mapuche, Pehuenches and other tribes in war with Spain. Over time Chillán became an important marketplace where Mapuches, Pehuenches, Mestizos and Criollos met. Many goods from Patagonia and the Argentine Pampas were brought into the market of Chillán across the mountain passes of the area. In the early 19th century the countryside of Chillán was ravaged by the Chilean War of Independence and a subsequent banditry epidemic. In 1939 the city was devastated by a large earthquake prompting the government to initiate an extensive reconstruction program.

History

The zone where Chillán was built was previously inhabited by indigenous people called Chiquillanes.

Chillán was founded in 1580 at the site of Chillán Viejo as San Bartolomé de Chillán by Martín Ruiz de Gamboa,
who was campaigning against the local indigenous peoples at the time, but this moniker did not fare well, and was replaced by the current name, which in the local Indian language means "where the Sun is sitting".

During the Mapuche uprising of 1655, the city was besieged by Mapuche warriors. The Spanish defended the city from trenches and a palisade fort. Hoping for a miracle, the Spaniards put an image of Mary near the trenches, against which Mapuches are said to have shot arrows. In early March, about one month after the onset of uprising, distress was such that the Spaniards abandoned the city and headed north, escaping the conflict zone. The Real Audiencia of Santiago declared the evacuation an act of cowardice, and prohibited refugees from Chillán to go beyond the Maule River north. As  an outbreak of smallpox occurred among the refugees, this was. in effect. a quarantine, as trespassing north was punished with death sentences.

From its foundation, Chillán has been at the heart of Chile's rich agricultural region. It is also in a region of seismic activity, suffering from devastating earthquakes throughout its history; the 1939 Chillán earthquake left over 30,000 dead and mobilized international help.

Chile's founding father, Bernardo O'Higgins, was born in Chillán in 1778. He was the force behind Chile's Independence from Spain, being elected supreme director and declaring independence after the Battle of Chacabuco against the Spaniards in 1817. His later victory at the Maipo battlefield cemented the country's freedom. He died in exile in Peru in 1842.

Climate
Chillán has a Mediterranean climate (Köppen climate classification Csb). Temperatures can occasionally exceed  from October to April.

The air in Chillán is the fourth-most polluted in Chile, after Santiago, Temuco, and Concepción. "As in Temuco, the main cause of air pollution in Chillán is the use of wood-burning stoves; about 62% of all households in Chillán use firewood as their main source of heating."

Demographics
Of these, 148,015 (91.4%) lived in urban areas and 13,938 (8.6%) in rural areas. The population grew by 8.3% (12,442 persons) between the 1992 and 2002 censuses.

The demonym for a person from Chillán, used for more than 400 years by local residents, is Chillanejo, yet this is not found in the Royal Spanish Academy Dictionary, which only recognizes Chillanense.

Notable people

In addition, Chillán has offered a number of artists. A notable example is Claudio Arrau, a pianist.  Additionally, Ramón Vinay is the tenor who played Otello in the 1950s, his recording of the role with Toscanini. He was a regular at the New York City Metropolitan Opera, where he sang both tenor and baritone roles. One of his last performances at this house was as the Barber of Seville's Basilio, a bass role. He retired from the stage in 1969.

Other "Chillanejos" include  writer Marta Brunet,  sculptor Marta Colvin,  painter Pacheco Altamirano, and  Juan de Dios Aldea, who, however, did not reach the international acclaim achieved by Arrau and Vinay. Super Smash Bros. player Gonzalo "ZeRo" Barrios who had a record-breaking 56-tournament winning streak is also from Chillán.

Administration
As a commune, Chillán is a third-level administrative division of Chile administered by a municipal council, headed by an alcalde, who is directly elected every four years. The 2008-2020 alcalde is Sergio Zarzar Andonie (ILE).

Within the electoral divisions of Chile, Chillán is represented in the Chamber of Deputies by Carlos Abel Jarpa  (PRSD) and Rosauro Martínez (RN) as part of the 41st electoral district, together with Coihueco, Pinto, San Ignacio, El Carmen, Pemuco, Yungay and Chillán Viejo. The commune is represented in the Senate by Victor Pérez Varela (UDI) and Felipe Harboe (PPD) as part of the 13th senatorial constituency (Biobío-Coast).

Transport
The city of Chillán is connected to Chile's capital Santiago by both a modern highway and a rebuilt railway system TerraSur that makes the trip in less than five hours. TerraSur, which terminates in Chillán station, and the  Alameda-Temuco train both operate on the railway connecting Chillan with Rancagua and Santiago.

Gallery

See also
 Termas de Chillán

References

Bibliography

External links

  Municipality of Chillán
 City map
 Chillán & Ñuble Fotográfico en Flickr

Communes of Chile
Populated places established in 1580
Capitals of Chilean regions
Populated places in Diguillín Province
1580 establishments in the Captaincy General of Chile